The Shire of Woongarra was a local government area located to the south and east of the regional city of Bundaberg.

History

The Barolin Division was established on 11 November 1879 under the Divisional Boards Act 1879. On 30 October 1885, part of Barolin Division was separated to create Woongarra Division to serve the region south of the Burnett River.

With the passage of the Local Authorities Act 1902, Woongarra Division became the Shire of Woongarra on 31 March 1903, while Barolin Division became the Shire of Barolin.

In 1909, the Woongarra Shire had an area of 35½ square miles, with a population of 3200, with 736 ratepayers and a capital value of properties totalling £206,736. The rates collected in 1908 totalled £2378, and the loan indebtedness is
£4956 9s 9d.

On 21 December 1917, the Shire of Barolin was dissolved and its area was split between the City of Bundaberg and the Shire of Woongarra.

The Shire's offices were located in 9 Barolin Street, Bundaberg.

On 21 November 1991, the Electoral and Administrative Review Commission, created two years earlier, produced its second report, and recommended that local government boundaries in the Bundaberg area be rationalised. The Local Government (Bundaberg and Burnett) Regulation 1993 was gazetted on 17 December 1993, and on 30 March 1994, the Shire of Woongarra was amalgamated with the Shire of Gooburrum to form the Shire of Burnett.

Towns and localities
 Alloway
 Ashfield
 Avoca
 Bargara
 Branyan
 Burnett Heads
 Calavos
 Coonarr
 Coral Cove
 Electra
 Elliott
 Elliott Heads
 Givelda
 Innes Park
 Kalkie
 Kensington
 Kepnock
 Kinkuna
 Millbank
 Mon Repos
 Pine Creek
 Port of Bundaberg
 Qunaba
 Rubyanna
 South Bingera
 Thabeban
 Windermere
 Woongarra

Population

Chairmen

 1885–1886 John Cran 
 1887-1889: J. Y. Walker 
 1890–1893 John Cran (again)
 1894–1895 T. Williams 
 1897: John Cran (again)
 1898: G. A. Waite 
 1905: W. J. Clements
 1927: Robert Oswald Nowell Strathdee

References

External links
 Local Government (Bundaberg and Burnett) Regulation 1993

Former local government areas of Queensland
1885 establishments in Australia
1994 disestablishments in Australia